Krasimir Chomakov (born 8 June 1977 in Plovdiv) is a former Bulgarian footballer who played as a midfielder.

Career
Chomakov is a former Bulgarian international and played with Maritsa Plovdiv, CSKA Sofia, Ravenna and Lecce. In 2002, after a short spell at Greek side Panionios, he opted to return to Italy and signed for then-Serie D club Boca San Lazzaro, where he played in a more attacking role, scoring 5 goals in 5 seasons (four in Serie D, plus one in Serie C2). In January 2007, he agreed a loan deal to Serie C1 Pizzighettone. In July 2007 he moved to Serie C1 Cremonese.

In February 2009 he was loaned out to Lega Pro Prima Divisione side Lecco for the remainder of the season. During his playing days Chomakov established a reputation as a skillful free kick taker.

International career
Chomakov is a former member of the Bulgaria U21 team, making 33 appearances and scoring 5 goals. He earned his first cap for Bulgaria on 20 July 1995, in the 0:0 draw with Uzbekistan in a friendly match.

Personal life
He is a fan of CSKA Sofia and Liverpool F.C. Chomakov is married and has a daughter named Alesiya. He helps with the sponsorship of amateur side Chernozemen.

International goals
Scores and results list Bulgaria's goal tally first.

Honours

Club
 CSKA Sofia
Bulgarian Cup (1): 1998–99

References

External links
 

1977 births
Living people
Bulgarian footballers
Bulgarian expatriate footballers
First Professional Football League (Bulgaria) players
FC Maritsa Plovdiv players
PFC CSKA Sofia players
Serie A players
Serie B players
U.S. Lecce players
Ravenna F.C. players
A.S. Pizzighettone players
U.S. Cremonese players
Bulgaria international footballers
Calcio Lecco 1912 players
Association football midfielders
Super League Greece players
Panionios F.C. players
Expatriate footballers in Italy
Bulgarian expatriate sportspeople in Italy
Footballers from Plovdiv
FC Spartak Plovdiv players